Frank Wrentmore (birth registered during fourth ¼ 1884 in Pontypridd) was a Welsh rugby union, and professional rugby league footballer who played in the 1900s. He played club level rugby union (RU) for Penygraig RFC, and club level rugby league (RL) for Mid-Rhondda, he served with the Somerset Light Infantry with the British Expeditionary Force in World War I.

Notable tour matches
Frank Wrentmore scored a try in Mid-Rhondda's 6–20 defeat by Australia at King George's Park, Tonypandy (Athletic Ground), Tonypandy.

Christmas truce
Frank Wrentmore participated in the Christmas truce, a series of widespread unofficial ceasefires that took place along the Western Front around Christmas 1914, during World War I.

References

External links
Search for "Wrentmore" at rugbyleagueproject.org
Christmas Truce 1914 → Soldiers 

1884 births
British Army personnel of World War I
Penygraig RFC players
Rugby league players from Pontypridd
Rugby union players from Pontypridd
Place of death missing
Somerset Light Infantry soldiers
Welsh rugby league players
Welsh rugby union players
Year of death missing
Participants of the Christmas truce of 1914
Welsh military personnel